Keith Wilson (born 26 November 1937) is a Canadian sailor. He competed in the Flying Dutchman event at the 1960 Summer Olympics.

References

External links
 

1937 births
Living people
Canadian male sailors (sport)
Olympic sailors of Canada
Sailors at the 1960 Summer Olympics – Flying Dutchman
Sportspeople from Montreal